The Spanish Barb horse is a direct descendant of the original horses brought over from Spain. It may be of any color.

History 
Horses from the southern Iberian peninsula and horses from North Africa are linked by genetic evidence. Iberian horses were shipped to the Americas in the sixteenth century, and gradually spread across much of the continent.

These horses were used by Native Americans in their cavalries, pioneers and their ranches, even the pony express owes tribute to the plucky Spanish horse. Soon, however, the horses known as mesteño or mustangs were seen as a nuisance. The rugged cowponies replaced by larger breeds and the Spanish horse of the Americas was on the verge of extinction.

See also
Barb horse

References 

Horse breeds originating in the United States